Killer Butterfly (살인나비를 쫓는 여자 - Salin nabireul jjonneun yeoja lit. A Woman Chasing a Killer Butterfly) is a 1978 South Korean film directed by Kim Ki-young.  It was released on Blu-ray by Mondo Macabro as Woman Chasing the Butterfly of Death; bonus material includes several interviews of people connected with the film.

Plot
A melodrama about a man who survives an attempted suicide/murder with a stranger while picnicking with friends. He goes on a cave expedition for a famous archaeologist where he discovers a skeleton several thousand years old. He meets the spirit of the skeleton in a dream (probably), and then becomes romantically involved with the archeologist's daughter.

Cast
Nam Koong Won
Kim Ja-ok
Kim Chung-chul
Kim Man
Park Am
Lee Hyang
Yeo Po
Yu Sun-cheol
Lee Gang-bae
Kim So-jo
Lee Hwa-si

References

Bibliography

External links

1970s Korean-language films
South Korean drama films
Films directed by Kim Ki-young